Félix Malu wa Kalenga  (September 22, 1936 — April 22, 2011) was a Congolese emeritus professor of Nuclear Physics and a scientist. He was a founding member of the Third World Academy of Science (TWAS). He was a  professor at Lovanium University and a Dean of the Polytechnic Faculty of the University of Kinshasa. He was also a commissioner of the general commission for atomic energy (CGEA) in the DRC and a director general of the regional center for nuclear studies in Kinshasa.

Early life and education 
Professor Félix Malu was born on September 22, 1936 in Boma, Congo. He obtained his Bsc Electrical and Electronics from Lovanium University in 1962. He obtained his MSc in the University of California, Berkeley, USA in 1963 and 1969, he bagged his doctorate degree in applied sciences at the Catholic University of Louvain.

Career

Academic career 
He was a professor at the Faculty of Applied Sciences at the University of Kinshasa, Democratic Republic of the Congo (DRC),  he became the Dean of the institution in 1970 and in 2000 he became an emeritus professor.

Scientific career 
Malu wa Kalenga led construction of the Triga Mark II reactor at the Regional Center for Nuclear Studies in Kinshasa. From 1965 to 2000 he was a Commissioner at the General Commission for Atomic Energy (CGEA) in the DRC and a Director General of the Kinshasa Regional Center for Nuclear Studies.

Fellowship and membership 
He was a Founding member of the World Academy of Sciences (TWAS), a member of the Board of Governors of the International Atomic Energy Agency (IAEA), Vienna. A Board Member of the United Nations University, in Tokyo and he was also a Member of the OAU Scientific Council, a Member of the Advisory Scientific Council of the Theoretical Physics Agency of Trieste, Italy, a Member of the Scientific Advisory Board of the International Atomic Energy Agency (IAEA), Vienna and a Member of the Vatican Pontifical Academy of Sciences for Applied Physics.

Death 
Félix Malu wa Kalenga died on April 22, 2011.

References 

1936 births
2011 deaths
TWAS fellows

Founder Fellows of the African Academy of Sciences

Fellows of the African Academy of Sciences